Daniel Lawrence Nugent (August 22, 1953 – October 18, 2001) was an American football offensive lineman in the National Football League (NFL) for the Washington Redskins. He played college football at Auburn University.

Early life
Nugent was born in Mount Clemens, Michigan and then moved to Florida. He attended Pompano Beach High School, where he played football as a tight end and defensive lineman from 1968 to 1970.

College career
Nugent attended and played college football at Auburn University, where he played tight end before moving to guard.

Professional career
Nugent was selected in the third round of the 1975 NFL Draft by the Los Angeles Rams. He was then traded to the Washington Redskins in 1976 for second and third round draft picks. He played for the Redskins from 1976 to 1980, before being cut during the 1981 offseason due to a herniated disc.

Personal life
Nugent married his wife, Lauren, in 1985.  He sold knee and hip implant supplies for Howmedica Osteonics of South Florida.  He died on October 18, 2001 in Boca Raton, Florida from leukemia.

References

External links
 
 

1953 births
2001 deaths
People from Mount Clemens, Michigan
Sportspeople from Metro Detroit
Players of American football from Michigan
Nugent, Dan
American football offensive guards
Auburn Tigers football players
Washington Redskins players